Bryan Jahir García Realpe (born 18 January 2001) is an Ecuadorian footballer who plays as midfielder for Brazilian club Athletico Paranaense.

Club career

Early career
Born in Rioverde, García began his career at local side Ciudadelas del Norte in 2016, aged just 15, in the Segunda Categoría.

Independiente del Valle
García joined Independiente del Valle's youth setup in 2018, playing for the under-18 and under-20 squads and winning the 2020 U-20 Copa Libertadores with the latter. Later in that year, he made his senior debut with the reserve team Independiente Juniors in the Ecuadorian Serie B.

García made his first team – and Serie A – debut on 30 August 2020, coming on as a second-half substitute for Gabriel Torres in a 3–0 home win over Guayaquil City. He scored his first professional goal the following 1 August, netting his team's fourth in a 4–0 home routing of Macará.

Athletico Paranaense
On 22 January 2022, García moved abroad and signed a four-year contract with Campeonato Brasileiro Série A side Athletico Paranaense.

Career statistics

Honours
Independiente del Valle
U-20 Copa Libertadores: 2020
Ecuadorian Serie A: 2021

References

2001 births
Living people
People from Río Verde Canton
Ecuadorian footballers
Association football midfielders
Ecuadorian Serie A players
Ecuadorian Serie B players
Campeonato Brasileiro Série A players
C.S.D. Independiente del Valle footballers
Club Athletico Paranaense players
Ecuadorian expatriate footballers
Ecuadorian expatriate sportspeople in Brazil
Expatriate footballers in Brazil